Law enforcement in Honduras is split among three law enforcement organisations.

 National Police of Honduras

Current branches
Transit Police (Honduras) (Policia de Transito), a police force in charge of automobile transportation. They take care of car crashes, parking violations and other infringements.
DGIC (Dirección General de Investigaciones Criminalisticas), the agency that  takes care of forensics and drug enforcement.
Cobras (Honduras), armed conflict people.

Past law enforcement bodies

Civil Guard, now abolished
Civil Guard in Honduras is a militarized police which was commanded directly by president Ramon Villeda Morales before his death, rather than the chief of the armed forces created in 1957.

Historical secret police organizations
Departamento Nacional de Investigaciones (DNI) (National Investigation Department)

See also 
 Crime in Honduras

References

Sources
 World Police Encyclopedia, ed. by Dilip K. Das & Michael Palmiotto.  by Taylor & Francis. 2004,  
 World Encyclopedia of Police Forces and Correctional Systems, 2nd.  edition,  Gale., 2006
 Sullivan, Larry E. et al.  Encyclopedia of Law Enforcement. Thousand Oaks: Sage Publications, 2005.

 
Law of Honduras